The 1887 Cork Senior Hurling Championship was the inaugural staging of the Cork Senior Hurling Championship since its establishment by the Cork County Board. The draw for the opening round fixtures took place on 30 January 1887.

The championship began on 6 March 1887, however the latter stages ended in disarray and were unfinished, however, Cork Nationals were subsequently declared the champions without having to play Passage in the final.

Participation

All clubs in County Cork were invited to participate in the inaugural championship. The closing date for entries was 29 January 1887. The cost of entering a team was 2s 6d.

Results

First round

Second round

Third round

Semi-finals

Final

Championship statistics

Miscellaneous

 The semi-final between Cork Nationals and St. Finbarr's ended after twenty minutes when both sides and the match officials disagreed over the awarding of a point. An emergency meeting of the Cork County Committee was held with representatives from Passage Hurling Club, St. Finbarr's and the Cork Nationals being brought before the meeting. After some discussion, the Passage Hurling Club agreed to withdraw from the championship. St. Finbarr's agreed to a proposal that lots be drawn between themselves and the Cork Nationals to decide who would represent Cork in the All-Ireland Championship. The Cork Nationals rejected the idea, however, they were later awarded the championship.

References

Cork Senior Hurling Championship
Cork Senior Hurling Championship